Lameshur Plantation, near Cruz Bay on St. Thomas, United States Virgin Islands, was listed on the National Register of Historic Places in 1978. It is located east of Cruz Bay on Little Lameshur Bay. It is included in the central part of Virgin Islands National Park and dates to 1780. It includes a horsemill.

References

National Register of Historic Places in Virgin Islands National Park
Buildings and structures completed in 1780
Saint Thomas, U.S. Virgin Islands